Karina Yaniv is an Israeli scientist who is best known for her contributions to the field of vascular development.  She is a Professor of Vascular Disease in the Department of Biological Regulation at the Weizman Institute of science, Rehovot, Israel.
She has three kids, and lives in the Weizmann Institute.

Research 
Yaniv researches the mechanisms regulating blood and lymphatic vessel formation during embryonic development and in disease. She uses the zebrafish embryo to investigate the mechanisms that control lineage specification of  lymphatic endothelial cells and the development of lymphatic vessels.

A recent achievement was the discovery of a new niche of specialized progenitors which gives rise to the lymphatic system. They identified the first “lymphatic-inducing” signal, capable of inducing lymphatic differentiation of human embryonic stem cells. Her laboratory generated for the first time human lymphatic endothelial cells in culture, which opens the way for other laboratories to understand the basic determinants and behavioral properties of these cells.

Research in Yaniv's laboratory also focuses on lymphatic vessels in the heart: how do they form and what is their possible role in heart diseases. Other projects focus on the mechanisms that control the formation of lymphatic vessels induced by tumors, since the lymphatic system is the key route for dissemination of metastatic cells.

Awards and honours 
In 2016, Yaniv was Awarded a LE&RN Wendy Chaite Leadership Award. She received grants from the Horizon 2020 program, including €2m for her LymphMap project. Other awards and honors include: European Research Council grant (2014–2019), Israel Cancer Research Foundation Career Development Award (2012), Werner-Risau-Prize for outstanding research in vascular biology (2007), EMBO postdoctoral fellowship (2005–2007), Susan G. Komen Young Investigator Scholarship from the Lymphatic Research Foundation, now LE&RN (2006). She is a member of the European Vascular biology Association (EVBO) and NAVBO.

Selected publications

References

External links 
 Personal website
 TEDx Talk Shaping Life from the Shapeless

Israeli scientists
Academic staff of Weizmann Institute of Science
Year of birth missing (living people)
Living people